Acharya Jnansagar or Gyansagar (1891–1973) was a Digambara Jain Acharya of 20th century who composed many Sanskrit epics. He initiated Acharya Vidyasagar in 1968 as a monk and 1972 as an Acharya.

Biography 
He was born in 1891 as Bhooramal Chhabra. His father was named Chaturbhuj Chhabra and mother Ghritbhari Devi. He was second of five brothers (Chhaganlal being the eldest and Gangaprasad, Gaurilal and Devdatt being the younger brothers).

After completing primary studies in his village, he further studied Sanskrit and Jain philosophy in Banaras at the famous Syadvad Mahavidyalaya founded by Ganeshprasad Varni. He was initiated a kshullak (Junior monk) by Acharya Veersagar who belonged to the lineage of Acharya Shantisagar. He was then named kshullak Gyanbhusan. He remained a kshullak for 2 years and 2 more years as Ailak before becoming a Muni (Full monk).

He was initiated a monk by Acharya Shivsagar who also belonged to the lineage of Acharya Shantisagar, in Khaniya ji, Jaipur in 1959. He was further elevated to the Acharya status in 1968 at Naseerabad, Rajasthan.

Works 
As an expert in Sanskrit, he had been a great composer in Sanskrit. At least 30 researchers have studied his works and were honored doctoral degrees. At least 300 scholars have presented research papers on his work.
His works includes 4 Sanskrit epics and 3 more Jain texts and that too in the time when the Sanskrit composition was almost obsolete. These creations have always surprised the modern Sanskrit scholars.

Stamp 

An official Government of India stamp in his memory was issues by minister Sachin Pilot on September 10, 2013 at Kishangarh Rajasthan. He thus became the first Digambar Jain Acharya to have a stamp released in his memory.

Tradition 
He belongs to the tradition established by Acharya Shantisagar:
 Acharya Shantisagar
 Acharya Virsagar
 Acharya Shivsagar
 Acharya Gyansagar
 Acharya Vidyasagar

References

Sanskrit poets
Jain acharyas
1891 births
1973 deaths
Indian Jain monks 
20th-century Indian Jains 
20th-century Jain monks 
20th-century Indian monks